Kingsley Junior Coman (born 13 June 1996) is a French professional footballer who plays as a winger for  club Bayern Munich and the France national team. Considered one of the best wingers in the world, Coman is known for his pace and dribbling ability.

Trained at Paris Saint-Germain's academy, Coman moved to Juventus in 2014 on the expiration of his contract, winning the Serie A and Coppa Italia in his first season in Italy. In August 2015, he transferred on loan to Bayern Munich, then permanently, winning seven Bundesliga, three DFB-Pokal, four DFL-Supercup and the 2020 UEFA Super Cup titles. He won the 2019–20 UEFA Champions League by scoring the only goal in the final against his former club Paris Saint-Germain.

Coman earned 39 caps and scored 11 goals in France's youth teams, from under-16 to under-21 levels. He made his debut for the senior team in November 2015 and represented the nation at UEFA Euro 2016, where they reached the final, as well as Euro 2020 and the 2022 FIFA World Cup, again making the final.

He is also notable as having won a league title each and every season since becoming a professional footballer.

Club career

Early years
Born in Paris to parents from Guadeloupe, Coman began his career with US Sénart-Moissy in 2002, at the age of six.

Paris Saint-Germain
After two years with the club and the support of his father, Coman was scouted by Ligue 1 club Paris Saint-Germain (PSG), with whom he joined the youth academy in 2004. After nine years in the club's youth system, Coman made his professional debut for PSG on 17 February 2013 against Sochaux, a 3–2 defeat. He came on as a substitute for Marco Verratti in the 87th minute.

At the time, Coman was the youngest player to play for PSG at the age of 16 years, eight months and four days.

On 3 August 2013, PSG won the Trophée des Champions, defeating Bordeaux 2–1 in Gabon. Coman played the final 16 minutes in place of Ezequiel Lavezzi.

Juventus

2014–15 season

On 7 July 2014, Coman signed a five-year deal with Italian champions Juventus following the expiration of his contract with PSG. On 30 August 2014, Coman made his Serie A debut, starting in a 1–0 away win against Chievo, twice nearly scoring.

On 15 January 2015, Coman scored his first professional goal in the last 16 of the Coppa Italia, against Hellas Verona in a 6–1 win. He was unused in the final on 20 May, a 2–1 extra-time win over Lazio.

On 6 June, Coman appeared as a last-minute substitute for compatriot Patrice Evra in the 2015 UEFA Champions League Final as Juventus were defeated 3–1 by Barcelona at Berlin's Olympiastadion.

2015–16 season
Coman started in the 2015 Supercoppa Italiana on 8 August at the Shanghai Stadium ahead of new signing Paulo Dybala, making way for him after an hour of the 2–0 win over Lazio.

On 30 August 2015, Juventus approved a two-year loan deal for Coman to join German club Bayern Munich. Juventus manager, Massimiliano Allegri said in a press conference the same day, "Coman will be leaving the club. He wanted to go.".

Bayern Munich

2015–16 season

On 30 August 2015, Coman signed with Bayern Munich on a two-year loan from Juventus for a fee of €7 million to be paid in two instalments with an option to buy for a fee of an extra €21 million upon 30 April 2017, two months before the loan's expiry. He was assigned the squad number 29.

Coman made his debut on 12 September, replacing Arturo Vidal after 56 minutes of an eventual 2–1 Bundesliga win over FC Augsburg at the Allianz Arena. A week later, on his first start, he scored his first goal for his new club, in a 3–0 victory at Darmstadt 98. The following week, he netted again in a win of the same margin at Mainz 05.

On 24 November, Coman scored his first Champions League goal in a 4–0 defeat of Olympiacos. He was runner-up to compatriot Anthony Martial of Manchester United for the 2015 Golden Boy, awarded to Europe's best player under 21 years of age.

On 12 March 2016, Coman recorded three assists in a 5–0 victory over Werder Bremen. Four days later, he came on as a 60th-minute substitute for Xabi Alonso, with Bayern trailing 0–2 in the second leg of the Champions League round of 16, and assisted Thomas Müller's 91st-minute equaliser, before scoring the final goal in extra time as Bayern won 4–2 (6–4 aggregate) against his parent club, Juventus.

Coman was a 108th-minute substitute for Franck Ribéry in the 2016 DFB-Pokal Final, which Bayern won against Borussia Dortmund on penalties for a double. It was his eighth club trophy before his 20th birthday.

2016–17 season
Coman made only 25 appearances in all competitions during the season. Coman had problems with injuries and couldn't force himself into the starting line-up like he did last season. Coman scored only two goals in his appearances.

On 27 April 2017, it was announced that Bayern exercised their option to sign Coman, with the player signing a contract until 2020.

During the season, Coman played a lesser role than under last season's manager, Pep Guardiola. At the end of the season, Coman said in an interview with France Football, "I was perhaps in a position that suited me a bit better [under Guardiola]. I had fewer injuries too. I played more on the wing, and the coach asked me to take people on. That's what I do best, it's the essence of my game. This season [under Ancelotti], it's a bit different, but a good player must be able to adapt to instructions and respect the choices of his coach."

In an interview with the German magazine kicker on 29 May 2017, Coman said, "It was a complicated year for me. I thought about leaving Bayern."

2017–18 season

The 2017–18 season was an excellent one for Coman. Coman had played 32 matches, scored seven goals and provided another eight assists throughout all competitions until late February, when Coman suffered an ankle injury against Hertha Berlin on 24 February 2018. Coman suffered a partial tear of ligaments in his left ankle. The injury required a surgery that was performed several days later. On 19 May 2018, Coman returned from the ankle injury in the DFB-Pokal Final in Berlin in a loss against Eintracht Frankfurt. Coman came on as a substitute in the 70th minute.

On 21 December 2017, Coman signed a contract extension at Bayern until 30 June 2023.

2018–19 season
On 12 August 2018, Coman played the first competitive fixture of the season after coming on as a substitute and scored a goal in a 5–0 victory over Eintracht Frankfurt as his team won the 2018 DFL-Supercup.

On 24 August 2018, Coman sustained a syndesmosis ligament tear above his left ankle in a match against 1899 Hoffenheim on Matchday 1 in the Bundesliga. This injury was similar to the injury Coman sustained last season when he was out for almost three months.

On 1 December 2018, Coman returned from injury when he came on as a substitute against Werder Bremen in a 2–1 win. Coman was out injured for three months. On 15 December 2018, Coman made his 100th appearance for Bayern in a 4–0 away win at Hannover. On 14 April 2019, Coman scored two goals for Bayern in a 4–1 win at Düsseldorf. It was Coman's third Bundesliga brace for Bayern.

On 18 May 2019, Coman won his fourth consecutive Bundesliga title and his seventh consecutive league title. A week later, Coman won his second DFB-Pokal as Bayern defeated RB Leipzig 3–0 in the 2019 DFB-Pokal Final. Coman scored Bayern's second goal in the match.

2019–20 season
In the final of the 2019–20 UEFA Champions League on 23 August 2020, Coman headed in the only goal of the game as Bayern secured their sixth Champions League title with a win over Paris Saint-Germain. In doing so, Coman became the first player in the history of the competition to score against a former club in the final.

2020–21 season
On 21 October 2020, Coman scored a brace and provided one assist in a 4–0 win against Atlético Madrid in the first match of the 2020–21 UEFA Champions League. Coman won his 10th league title of his professional career on 8 May 2021 after closest challengers RB Leipzig failed to win their match against Borussia Dortmund.

2021–22 season
Before the 2021–22 season, Coman was assigned the number 11 shirt left vacant after the departure of Douglas Costa. Entering this season, Kingsley Coman hired agent Pini Zahavi, who also represented former teammates David Alaba and Robert Lewandowski to secure a transfer to another club. After Zahavi was unable to do so, Coman fired him and re-signed his contract with FC Bayern Munich on 12 January 2022 until 2027.

2022–23 season
On 21 August 2022, he scored his first goal of the season in a 7–0 win over VfL Bochum. On 14 February 2023, he scored the only goal in a 1–0 away victory over his former club Paris Saint-Germain in the round of 16.

International career

On 2 June 2014, aged just 17, Coman made his first appearance for the French under-21 team, starting in a 6–0 friendly victory against Singapore and scoring once in the match.

On 5 November 2015, Coman was selected to the France senior squad for the first time to face Germany and England in friendlies. He made his debut eight days later at the Stade de France, coming on as a 69th-minute substitute for Anthony Martial in a 2–0 win over world champions Germany, overshadowed by shootings and explosions around the stadium.

The following 29 March against Russia, in the first game at the venue since the attacks, Coman replaced Martial at half time and scored his first international goal when set up by Dimitri Payet, confirming a 4–2 win.

In May 2016, Coman was named to national team manager Didier Deschamps' 23-man France squad for UEFA Euro 2016, to be played on home soil. Following his performances throughout the tournament, as his nation reached the final, only to lose 1–0 to Portugal in extra-time, Coman was nominated for the Young Player of the Tournament Award, which ultimately went to Portugal's Renato Sanches.

Coman was one of eleven players that were put on standby for France's squad at the 2018 FIFA World Cup in Russia. Coman was not called up for the 2018 World Cup due to injury.

On 2 June 2019, Coman made his comeback for France against Bolivia after 19 months of not playing for the national team. Coman came on as a substitute in the 65th minute.

In June 2021, Coman was included in the final 26-man squad for the postponed UEFA Euro 2020. On 9 November 2022, he was included in the final squad for the 2022 FIFA World Cup in Qatar.
On 18 December 2022, he came on as a substitute in the 2022 FIFA World Cup final against Argentina, the match finished 3-3 and went to a penalty shoot-out. Coman took France's second penalty in the shoot-out which was saved, with Argentina going on to win 4-2 on penalties.

Style of play
Regarded as one of the most promising young players of his generation, Coman is a quick, talented and technically gifted winger, with good dribbling skills, vision, and explosive speed and acceleration. He is capable of playing on either flank, or even in the centre, as an offensive midfielder or as a striker. Although he is naturally right-footed, his preferred position is on the left, which allows him to beat opponents in one on one situations, cut into the centre onto his right foot, and either shoot on goal, create chances for teammates, or make attacking runs into the area. In 2015, Don Balón named him one of the 101 best young players in the world.

Under Julian Nagelsmann at Bayern and Didier Deschamps in the France senior national team, Coman has occasionally played as an attacking right wingback.

Personal life
In June 2017, Coman was arrested for domestic violence after allegedly physically assaulting model Sephora Goignan, his ex-girlfriend. Coman reportedly admitted to the charges on Instagram. In September 2017 Coman pleaded guilty in a French court and agreed to pay €5,000 to Goignan. In June 2021, he had his first child with his girlfriend Sabrina, who is from Sweden, and the pair owns an apartment in Stockholm.

Career statistics

Club

International

As of match played 17 November 2020
Scores and results list France's goal tally first

Honours
Paris Saint-Germain
 Ligue 1: 2012–13, 2013–14
 Trophée des Champions: 2013

Juventus
 Serie A: 2014–15
 Coppa Italia: 2014–15
 Supercoppa Italiana: 2015
 UEFA Champions League runner-up: 2014–15

Bayern Munich
 Bundesliga: 2015–16, 2016–17, 2017–18, 2018–19, 2019–20, 2020–21, 2021–22
 DFB-Pokal: 2015–16, 2018–19, 2019–20
 DFL-Supercup: 2016, 2017, 2018, 2020, 2021, 2022
 UEFA Champions League: 2019–20
 FIFA Club World Cup: 2020

France
 FIFA World Cup runner-up: 2022
 UEFA European Championship runner-up: 2016

Individual
 kicker Bundesliga Team of the Season: 2018–19
Titi d'Or: 2012, 2013
Bundesliga Goal of the Month: March 2022

References

External links

Profile at the FC Bayern Munich website

1996 births
Living people
Footballers from Paris
French footballers
Association football wingers
Paris Saint-Germain F.C. players
Juventus F.C. players
FC Bayern Munich footballers
Ligue 1 players
Serie A players
Bundesliga players
UEFA Champions League winning players
France youth international footballers
France under-21 international footballers
France international footballers
UEFA Euro 2016 players
UEFA Euro 2020 players
2022 FIFA World Cup players
French expatriate footballers
Expatriate footballers in Germany
Expatriate footballers in Italy
French expatriate sportspeople in Germany
French expatriate sportspeople in Italy
Black French sportspeople
French people of Guadeloupean descent